Dušan Stevanović (born 22 June 1996) is a Serbian professional footballer who plays as a central defender for Radnik Surdulica.

References

External links
 
 

Living people
1996 births
Serbian footballers
Sportspeople from Niš
Association football defenders 
FK Vojvodina players
FK Ozren Sokobanja players
FK Lovćen players
FK Dinamo Vranje players
FK Radnik Surdulica players
Serbian SuperLiga players
Serbian First League players